Kavita (Hindi: कविता) is a feminine given name.

Notable people named Kavita 
 Kavita K. Barjatya (born 1977), Indian producer
 Kavita Channe (born 1980), American sports announcer
 Kavita Daswani (born 1971), American-Indian writer
 Kavita Goyat (born 1988), Indian boxer
 Kavita Jain (born 1972), Indian politician
 Kavita Kaushik (born 1981), Indian actress
 Kavita Krishnamurthy (born 1958), Indian playback singer
 Kavita Lad (born 1968), Indian actress
 Kavita Radheshyam (born 1985), Indian actress
 Kavita Ramdas (born 1962), Indian Executive Director
 Kavita Raut (born 1985), Indian long-distance runner
 Kavita Roy (born 1980), Indian cricketer
 Kavita Srinivasan, Indian actress
 Kavita Seth (born 1970), Indian singer
 Kavita Sidhu (born 1971), Malaysian actress and former beauty queen
 Kavitha Lankesh (born 1974), Indian director, screenwriter and lyricist
 Kavita Oberoi (born 1970), British entrepreneur
 Kavita Puri, British journalist, radio broadcaster and author
 Kavita Chaudhary, Indian actress
 Kavita Kapoor, Indian actress

Fictional characters 
Kavita Rao, from  Marvel Comics universe of the X-Men.

Others 
Kavita poetry magazine, Bengali poetry magazine.

Hindu given names
Indian feminine given names